Hrvoje Kurtović (born 6 October 1983) is a retired Croatian football midfielder, who last played for Osijek in the Prva HNL.

Club career
Born in Osijek, Croatia, Kurtović got his first opportunity to play for his hometown Prva HNL club, and at the highest level of Croatian football at the beginning of 2009, aged 25, under Tomislav Steinbrückner, after Goran Todorčev got sidelined due to three yellow cards. He remained a fixture in the first team, ever since - a strongly divisive figure, lauded by some, including his coaches<, for tenaciousness and his work rate, but dismissed by many for an alleged lack of technical abilities and proneness to errors. He nevertheless became the team's captain in 2014, after Ivo Smoje's retirement from professional football.

References

External links
 

1983 births
Living people
Footballers from Osijek
Association football midfielders
Croatian footballers
Croatia youth international footballers
NK Grafičar Vodovod players
NK Zadar players
HNK Vukovar '91 players
NK Osijek players
Croatian Football League players